Five-day week may refer to:

Workweek (or Working Week)
Week#"Weeks" in other calendars for Five-day Weeks (five-day grouping/five-day division of a month, year, etc.)